The Thunderer el.  is a mountain peak in the northeast section of Yellowstone National Park, in the Absaroka Range of the U.S. state of Wyoming. Named by members of the Arnold Hague Geological Survey of 1885 for its propensity to attract thunderstorms, the mountain is a long high ridge just north of Mount Norris. Prior to 1885, the peak was merely considered a high ridge extending north from Mount Norris rather than a separately named peak. The Thunderer is easily visible from the northeast entrance road as it passes up the Soda Butte Creek canyon.

The north end of the ridge can be reached via the  Thunderer Cutoff Trail. The trailhead is located just opposite the Pebble Creek Campground on the northeast entrance road. This trail passes through Chaw Pass to connect with the Cache Creek trail which parallels the southeast face of The Thunderer ridge.

See also
 Mountains and mountain ranges of Yellowstone National Park

Notes

Mountains of Wyoming
Mountains of Yellowstone National Park
Mountains of Park County, Wyoming